Professor Liu Changming (simplified Chinese: 刘昌明; traditional Chinese: 劉昌明; pinyin: liú chāng míng) is a Chinese watercolor/gouache painter, oil painter, and fine arts educator.

Biography 
Liu Changming was born in 1952 in Ganzhou, Jiangxi. He mainly teaches western painting and theory. 

In 1981 he graduated from Gannan Normal University Art Department, then in 1986 he graduated from the oil painting department of China Central Academy of Fine Arts, and in 1996 from (CAFA) and the Graduate School of Art Institute of Xiamen University.

He is also a member of China Artists Association, and a member of the China Watercolor Painters Association. He is entitled to State Special Allowance by the China State Council and is concurrently a Professor and Master Supervisor of the Art Academy of Soochow University (Suzhou).

Artistic accomplishments 
 Silver prize in the Sixth National Art Exhibition in 1989 (China's top level specification and the largest national fine arts exhibition. Sponsored by Ministry of Culture of the People's Republic of China, China Federation of Literary and Art Circles and the Chinese Artists Association, held every five years. Silver Award was the highest award that year, the Gold Award was not made).
 Silver prize in the Fourth National watercolor exhibition.
 Bronze prize in the Eighth National Art Exhibition.
 Gold prize in the Third East China college professors Art Exhibition.
 Excellence award in the joint art exhibition of Taiwan and Guangdong in 1990. 
 Golden Horse Prize in the Hangzhou National watercolor painting exhibition in 1991.
 Excellence award in Invitational Exhibition of China, Australia and Hong Kong's greatest watercolor painters in 2000. 
 Inducted into "Chinese watercolor Centennial Retrospective Exhibition (1905-2006)" in 2006.(Sponsored by Ministry of Culture of the People's Republic of China, China Artists Association and National Art Museum of China, is a summary of centuries of Chinese watercolor. 300 Chinese watercolor representative works joined the exhibition)
 "Net Fish series#2" was selected into the eighth National Watercolor/Gouache exhibition in 2007. (Sponsored by China Artists Association, a national academic exhibition held every two years)
 Excellence award in the First Oil painting exhibition of China Artists Association members in 2012.

Influences 
Many works of Liu have been collected by the National Art Museum of China, as well as by the Asian Museum of Watercolor Art, and many other of them are collected both inside and outside art museums, galleries, and clubs. His works have attracted the attention from collectors throughout the world. Examples include: "A teacher's table", collected by National Art Museum of China, and listed in the classic collection (a significant breakthrough in both skill and style is identified in this work); "Net fish series" (also considered classic). "Rose N#1" and "Rose N#2" were collected by the Asian Museum of Watercolor Art (Asia's first international Watercolor collection organization). As one of the thirty-three most famous painters selected by the Chinese mainland, an invitation was made for his works to be included in the Cross-Strait Famous Artists Watercolor Exhibition (sponsored by the Taiwan culture bureau, Taiwan "education ministry" and The CKS Memorial Hall. The majority of his works were included in the "Collection treasures of National Art Museum of China", the "Outstanding art collection of 50-years of People's Republic of China", and "China's modern art collection". His published works include, "Drawing Towards Watercolor ", "Liu Changming Album", and "The boundary of the water-colour", among others.

In addition to watercolor paintings, Liu's oil painting presents another unique set of personal characteristics. He works mainly in the medium of the still life, forming a complete expression of "image" which is fundamentally different from classic oil paintings in the style of still life. As an important contemporary Chinese artist, his exploration of style has been of considerable concern.

References

External links
 A Teacher's Table
 Watercolor Painting in China - The Best of A Century 
 Aisas Museum of Watercolor Art Takes Liu Changming's Work in Collection
 Chinese National Artists' Association Announced the Short-listed Work for Selected Exhibition of Oil Painting and Engraving Works

1952 births
Living people
Watercolorists
Central Academy of Fine Arts alumni
Xiamen University alumni